Tigrana is a village and Indus Valley civilisation (IVC) archaeological sites in the Bhiwani district of Haryana state of India.

People

Demography 

, the village had 2,053 households with a population of 10,712 of which 5,703 were male and 5,009 female. All inhabitants are Hindus and the dominate castes are Rajputs,Brahmins, OBC and SC.

Culture and festivals 

Tigrana is famous for the temple Baba Paramhans Tigrania (Baba Chorewala). Each year the temple celebrates a Hindu festival (melā) in the month of July (5th tithi of the month of Shraavana and 700 years old lord shiva temple

Indus-Saraswati Valley Civilisation

Mounds and history of excavation 

In 2021, Central University of Haryana under the leadership of the Excavation Director Professor Dr. Narendra Parmar. It is carried out in association with the Deccan College Post-Graduate and Research Institute in which students from Haryana, Himachal Pradesh, Uttar Pradesh, Assam, Maharashtra, and Kerala also participated. Excavation is also aimed at finding out the source and trade network of bronze, copper, precious stones, jewellery, agriculture, economics, food habits and consumables, domestic and wildlife species, etc.

Dating 

Dating and scientific tests were done at the laboratory of Birbal Sahni Institute of Palaeosciences (BSIP) at Lucknow. Artifacts were dated to be 5000 years old belonging to the "Early Harappan Phase".

Finds

Seal, script and language 

A 5000 year old seal was found with 4 alphabets of the IVC script and language painted in black. This seal has 4 alphabets or characters, from right to left, a vertical fish shaped character, followed by two upward arrow shaped characters and finally a U-shaped character. Elsewhere, overall nearly 500 characters or alphabets of IVC script have been found which are yet to be deciphered.

Houses and pottery 

A house made of 10 x 20 x 34 cm mud bricks was found which had one large room, courtyard, gallery or veranda, two small rooms and a kitchen.  Pottery of baked clay found here includes kitchen utensils, such as thali (platter), matka (pot), bowl, "bela" (flat-bottomed wide and shallow bowl with rim), and other kitchen artifacts with attractive paintings.

Jewelry, precious stones, and metals 

Bronze metal was found. Other finds include semi-precious stones such as agate, carnelian, sodalite, steatite (soapstone), faience, etc. which were used for making jewelry and lockets. Bangles and beads made from conch shell, baked clay beads and bangles, etc. were also found.

Agriculture and crop 

BSIP tests concluded that 5000 years ago five crops, namely "bajara" (pearl millet), barley, "jawar" (sorghum), and pulses were cultivated at Tigrana. Some of the pottery is painted with the pictures of paddy (rice) crop. Finds include terracotta figurines of animals of which the bull figurines are most numerous indicating the abundance and importance of domesticated bull in the local agriculture and economy. Figurine of bullock cart was also found.

Trade 

Carnelian found here, which is not found locally and is found around Gulf of Khambhat, indicates trade with Gujarat via shipping channels of paleo-Sarasvati River.

Context - related sites nearby 

There are several Indus Valley civilisation sites and cultures nearby.

 Meluhha
 Indus–Mesopotamia relations 
 Conflict with the Akkadians and Neo-Sumerians
 Some of the List of Indus Valley Civilization sites within Haryana are as follows:
 Bhirrana, 4 phases of IVC with earliest dated to 8th-7th millennium BCE
 Kalibanga, an IVC town and fort with several phases starting from Early harappan phase
 Rakhigarhi, one of the largest IVC city with 4 phases of IVC with earliest dated to 8th-7th millennium BCE
 Rakhigarhi Indus Valley Civilisation Museum
 Kunal, cultural ancestor of Rehman Dheri
 Mitathal, 5 km northeast of Tigrana
 List of inventions and discoveries of the Indus Valley Civilization
 Hydraulic engineering of the Indus Valley Civilization
 Sanitation of the Indus Valley civilisation
 Periodisation of the Indus Valley civilisation
 Pottery in the Indian subcontinent
 Bara culture, subtype of Late-Harappan Phase
 Cemetery H culture (2000-1400 BC), early Indo-Aryan pottery at IVC sites later evolved into Painted Grey Ware culture of Vedic period
 Black and red ware, belonging to neolithic and Early-Harappan phases
 Sothi-Siswal culture, subtype of Early-Harappan Phase

See also 

 Haryana Tourism
 History of Haryana
 List of Monuments of National Importance in Haryana
 List of State Protected Monuments in Haryana

References 

Archaeological sites in Haryana
Archaeological sites in Hisar district
Pre-Indus Valley civilisation sites
Tourist attractions in Haryana
Villages in Bhiwani district